Dahan Rud (also Romanized as Dahan Rūd; also known as Dahāneh Rūd) is a village in Meyghan Rural District, in the Central District of Nehbandan County, South Khorasan Province, Iran. At the 2006 census, its population was 71, in 21 families.

References 

Populated places in Nehbandan County